Union Films was a film production company located in Batavia, Dutch East Indies (now Jakarta, Indonesia). Established by ethnic Chinese businessmen Ang Hock Liem and Tjoa Ma Tjoen in 1940, it produced seven black-and-white films before it was dissolved in 1942; all are thought to be lost. The company's films were directed by four men, mostly ethnic Chinese, and launched the careers of actors such as Rendra Karno and Djoewariah.

Established during the revival of the Indies film industry, Union released its first film, Kedok Ketawa, in July 1940. This was followed by a series of films penned by Saeroen which were increasingly oriented towards the Indies' growing intelligentsia and attempted to distance themselves from the theatrical conventions which were common in the contemporary film industry. This continued after Saeroen left for Star Film in 1941, with Union's final two productions emphasising realism. Following the Japanese occupation of the Indies in March 1942, Union was dissolved, though its films continued to be screened into the mid 1940s.

History
Following the commercial successes of Terang Boelan (Full Moon; 1937), Fatima (1938), and Alang-Alang (Grass; 1939), the film industry of the Dutch East Indies – which had been severely weakened by the Great Depression – was revived. Film production increased and, in 1940, four new production houses were opened, including Union Films. The company was funded by ethnic Chinese businessman Ang Hock Liem, who is credited as producer for the majority of the company's releases; daily operations, however, were handled by Tjoa Ma Tjoen. Union was headquartered in Prinsenlaan, Batavia (now Mangga Besar, Jakarta), and, according to a press release, established to "improve the quality of Indonesian art".

The fledgling Union's first film, Kedok Ketawa, was released in July 1940. Following a young couple who face off against criminals with the help of a masked bandit, this film was directed by Jo An Djan and starred Oedjang, Fatimah, and Basoeki Resobowo. It received positive reviews; the journalist Saeroen wrote in Pemandangan that the film's quality was comparable to imported Hollywood productions, and a review in Bataviaasch Nieuwsblad praised the cinematography. Following these positive reviews, Union hired Saeroen – who had previously written Terang Boelan and several works for Tan's Film – as a screenwriter. He made his debut for the company with Harta Berdarah, directed by new hires R Hu and Rd Ariffien, following Jo An Djan's departure for Populair's Film. The film, in which a young man convinces a miserly hajji to be more charitable, was released in October 1940 and starred the singer Soelastri and martial artist Zonder.

Union released their third production, Bajar dengan Djiwa, by February 1941. Directed by R Hu, this film – a drama in which a young woman is sold to a loan shark in order to pay her father's debt – marked the film debut of Djoewariah; she later became Union's leading lady. Ariffien, meanwhile, was tasked with directing Asmara Moerni, based on a script by Saeroen. Attempting to reach the educated audiences by casting a young doctor, Adnan Kapau Gani, opposite Djoewariah, this romance told of a young man who is ultimately able to marry his former maid after she receives an education. Released in April, the film received mixed reviews: one, in the Bataviaasch Nieuwsblad, found the film "fascinating", while another for the same paper considered the film dependent on the stage traditions which its advertisements had denounced.

In July 1941 Union released Wanita dan Satria, a Djoewariah vehicle which follows a well-born womaniser who abuses his social status to gain women's trust before ultimately getting his comeuppance. In advertising Wanita dan Satria, the company again emphasised the non-theatrical background of the film's cast, which also included Moesa, Djoewita and Hidajat. The film received positive reviews; one, from the Soerabaijasch Handelsblad, wrote that Wanita dan Satria "gives a clear picture of the precarious position of Indonesian women and motivates the desire for a firmer outline of her rights in the Moslem society". This was the company's last film to be directed by Ariffien or written by Saeroen; both men migrated to rival company Star Film soon afterwards.

Hu remained with Union and directed the company's next production, Soeara Berbisa, with peranakan sound technician Boen Kin Nam serving as assistant director. Written by Djojopranoto, the work followed two young men who compete for the love of a woman before learning that they are long-lost brothers. Djoewita had left the company at this point, and the studio hired Raden Soekarno for the leading role of this late 1941 release. The company's final completed production, Mega Mendoeng, was directed by Boen and announced soon after shooting for Soeara Berbisa had begun. This film, a romance starring Soekarno and new find Sofiati, was released in early 1942. In producing both films, Union emphasised realism and targeted educated audiences.

By the end of 1941, the government of the Dutch East Indies were concerned that Empire of Japan could invade the colony. This fear reached the general populace, and the February 1942 edition of the film magazine Pertjatoeran Doenia dan Film reported that several studios would move away from the colonial capital of Batavia or go on a production hiatus. Union, though already beginning production of a film set in the Majapahit era titled Damar Woelan, was forced to stop filming. When the Japanese occupied the Indies in March 1942, Union was closed, never to reopen.

Aside from Ariffien, who continued directing into the 1960s, none of Union's directors or producers returned to the film industry after the conclusion of the Japanese occupation in 1945. Several actors continued their careers. Djoewariah, for instance, made her first film after leaving Union, Sehidup Semati (One Life, One Death), in 1949, and continued acting until the mid-1950s. Soekarno's career lasted through the 1970s; he was mostly credited as Rendra Karno after changing his name in the 1950s. Others had careers behind the screen; Kedok Ketawa star Basoeki Resobowo, for instance, became art director on films such as Darah dan Doa (The Long March; 1950).

Filmography

In a period of two years, Union released seven films; all were feature length, made in black-and-white, and received wide releases in the Dutch East Indies. Several were screened in nearby Singapore, including Bajar dengan Djiwa and Asmara Moerni. Though its films were screened at least into the 1940s, the company's output is likely lost.
Kedok Ketawa (Laughing Mask; 1940)
Harta Berdarah (Bloody Treasure; 1940)
Bajar dengan Djiwa (Pay with [One's] Soul; 1941)
Asmara Moerni (True Love; 1941)
Wanita dan Satria (The Woman and the Hero; 1941)
Soeara Berbisa (Venomous Voice; 1941)
Mega Mendoeng (1942)

See also
List of lost films

Explanatory notes

References

Works cited

 
 

 

 

 (book acquired from the collection of Museum Tamansiswa Dewantara Kirti Griya, Yogyakarta)

 

1940 establishments in the Dutch East Indies
1942 disestablishments in the Dutch East Indies
Mass media companies established in 1940
Mass media companies disestablished in 1942
Film production companies of the Dutch East Indies
Defunct companies of the Dutch East Indies